"Dame Tu Mano" is a 1992 single by German synthpop band Cetu Javu taken from their second album Where Is Where.

Track listings

7" Promo vinyl
 Blanco y Negro Music / BNS-325 (One sided)

12" vinyl
 SPA: Blanco y Negro Music / MX 325

References

1991 singles
Cetu Javu songs
1991 songs
ZYX Music singles
Blanco y Negro Records singles